Zemské desky (in old Czech, always desky zemské, literal translation, "Land tables") is old Czech source of law. It is predecessor of land registry for real estates owned under allodial title (hereditary estates). Also resolutions of Diets, rulings of the Land (supreme) Court and other general legal rules were recorded there.

They enjoyed kind of special quasi-worship: they were called the "witness which cannot be prevailed upon". Only very few people could have access to them. During sessions of the Land Court, when called as evidence, they were not brought in the Court's main hall, but only read from a special balcony. Officer in charge of them was the Lord High Scribe of Bohemia, from the gentry. They were not led a book - a year, but record after record filling the whole book, not to waste paper. Also they were not numbered, but hand painted with different symbols, and then called as book of colour ... of that symbol, e.g. (Book - Quaternus - of) Color of Death, Color of Parrot etc.

In Bohemia, they were kept from before 1278. But these all burnt during the great Fire of Prague on June 2, 1541, the only exception was Volume from years 1316-1324. Since year 1541 the Bohemian tables have been preserved. Moravian tables go uninterruptedly from their founding in 1348. During reign of Francis II (1795) they were numbered and the practice of colors and poetical names stopped. They ceased to be used for recording in the year 1948, as a source of law in rare cases serve up today.

References

Czech manuscripts